Gnana Paravai is a 1991 Tamil language supernatural thriller film, directed by Vietnam Veedu Sundaram. The film stars Sivaji Ganesan, Harish Kumar, Sasikala and Manorama. It was released on 11 January 1991.

Plot

The film is about an old man Sivaji (Sivaji Ganesan), who can tell the character and the future of a person by just looking in his eyes. Giri (Harish Kumar) is a rich student who spends a lot of money on his friends. He falls in love with Sivaji's daughter Aruna, but Aruna rejects him and humiliates him. Giri decides to not give up. Later, Aruna and her friend Rajeswari (Sasikala) go to a picnic with their classmates. Giri's friend Aandavar (K. S. Raghuram) doesn't want to see Giri and Aruna together, for fear that Giri won't spend any more money on his friends. Later, Giri and Aandavar plan to humiliate Aruna. Aruna is blamed to be a nymphomaniac, to prove the contrary the innocent girl commits suicide. The hatred intensifies between Giri and Rajeswari. In the meantime, Rajeswari's brother-in-law Dinesh (Rajasekhar) burns Rajeswari's sister and wants to marry Rajeswari. Finally, Sivaji and Giri come to her rescue.

Cast

Sivaji Ganesan as Sivaji
Harish Kumar as Giri
Sasikala as Rajeswari
Manorama
Rajasekar as Dinesh
V. K. Ramasamy as Annachi
Ganthimathi as Annachi's wife
Rajvi as Aruna
Charle as Kanni
Chinni Jayanth as Sachidhanandam
Raghuram as Aandavar
Sudha
Priya
Thillai Rajan
Haja Shareef
Kumaran
Sakthi Thamu
Muthukumar
Dr. Rajendran
M. S. Bhaskar
Prahasam as Lecturer Prahasam
Master Saran as Annachi's son

Soundtrack

The film score and the soundtrack were composed by M. S. Viswanathan. The soundtrack, released in 1991, features 5 tracks with lyrics written by Vaali, Valampuri John and Kamakodiyan.

References

External links

1991 films
1990s Tamil-language films
Films scored by M. S. Viswanathan